Ed Bouchette is an American sportswriter. From 1985 until 2019, he was a writer for the Pittsburgh Post-Gazette covering the Pittsburgh Steelers, before moving to The Athletic in 2019. He is a member of the Pro Football Hall of Fame's selection committee.

In 2014, Bouchette was given the Dick McCann Memorial Award from the Pro Football Hall of Fame.

References

Living people
Year of birth missing (living people)
Place of birth missing (living people)
Sportswriters from Pennsylvania
Dick McCann Memorial Award recipients